Say It with Flowers  is a 1960 mystery detective novel by the British writer Gladys Mitchell. It is the thirty third in the long-running series of books featuring Mitchell's best known character, the psychoanalyst and amateur detective Mrs Bradley.

Synopsis
Two Bohemians set out to find Roman era remains in the British countryside. When the amateur archaeologists unearth a skeleton they proudly display it as evidence of their theories. However, Mrs Bradley is unconvinced and the tests she has made reveal the skeleton is much more recent, likely a murder victim of the past decade.

References

Bibliography
 Reilly, John M. Twentieth Century Crime & Mystery Writers. Springer, 2015.

1960 British novels
Novels by Gladys Mitchell
British crime novels
British mystery novels
British thriller novels
Novels set in England
British detective novels
Michael Joseph books